CFIC-FM is a First Nations community radio format operates at 105.1 FM in Listuguj, Quebec, Canada.

Owned by Micmac Historical Cultural Arts Society, the station was licensed in 1999. The radio station was started in 1995 with a native American music format.

References

External links
 

Fic
Fic
Fic
Radio stations established in 1999
1999 establishments in Quebec